Siaosi Pōhiva is a Tongan politician and Member of the Legislative Assembly of Tonga. He is the eldest son of former Tongan Prime Minister ʻAkilisi Pōhiva and Neomai Tuitupou Of Kolomotua he is also a member of the Democratic Party of the Friendly Islands.

Pōhiva has previously worked for the Educational Quality and Assessment Program of the Pacific Community. He was elected to Parliament in a by-election following the death of his father in 2019.

In December 2019 Pōhiva was elected president of the Tonga Rugby Union.

He contested the 2021 Tongan general election, but was unsuccessful.

References

Living people
Members of the Legislative Assembly of Tonga
Democratic Party of the Friendly Islands politicians
Year of birth missing (living people)